Black Pine Cone, at  above sea level is a peak in the Black Pine Mountains of Idaho. The peak is located in Sawtooth National Forest in Cassia County. No roads or trails go to the summit.

References 

Mountains of Idaho
Mountains of Cassia County, Idaho
Sawtooth National Forest